Deh-e Mirza Ali (also Romanized as Deh-e Mīrzā ‘Alī; also known as Mīrzā ‘Alī) is a village in Dust Mohammad Rural District, in the Central District of Hirmand County, Sistan and Baluchestan Province, Iran. At the 2006 census, its population was 104, in 26 families.

References 

Populated places in Hirmand County